The Chicago Surrealist Group was founded in Chicago, Illinois, in July 1966 by Franklin Rosemont, Penelope Rosemont, Bernard Marszalek, Tor Faegre and Robert Green after a trip to Paris in 1965, during which they were in contact with André Breton. Its initial members came from far-left or anarchist backgrounds and had already participated in groups IWW (calling themselves the Rebel Worker Group and putting out a magazine called the Rebel Worker) and SDS; indeed, the Chicago group edited an issue of Radical America, the SDS journal, and the SDS printshop printed some of the group's first publications.

Collaborations and projects 
The group played a major role in organizing the World Surrealist Exhibition held at Gallery Black Swan in Chicago in 1976. As the name suggests, broader in scope than previous "international" exhibitions, it featured hundreds of works almost exclusively from contemporary participants in surrealism from thirty-one countries.

Marvelous Freedom/Vigilance of Desire was the name for the catalogue of the 1976 World Surrealist Exhibition. It contains a number of texts and reproductions, as well as a blueprint of the layout of the gallery, with the location of the different "domains" into which the exhibition was organised.

The Chicago Group has also collaborated on the surrealist issue of the journal Race Traitor, and the "Totems Without Taboos" show at the Heartland Cafe in Chicago. It sporadically publishes a newspaper entitled WHAT Are You Going To Do About It? and the journal Arsenal/Surrealist Subversion.

The Surrealist Movement in the United States was started by the Chicago Surrealist Group as a means of including many of its scattered participants from coast to coast on collective statements and in collective activities.

Participants in the group's activities have included Clarence John Laughlin, Gerome Kamrowski, Philip Lamantia, Tristan Meinecke and Franklin Rosemont. As participants past and present have been based in cities other than Chicago, the group has never been strictly defined by geography, despite its name. The group has worked with others, such as The Surrealist Group in Stockholm, with which it met in Chicago and Stockholm in 1986, publishing the International Surrealist Bulletin No. 1.

See also
 The Surrealist Group in Stockholm

References

Bibliography 
 Rosemont, Franklin and Charles Radcliffe. Dancin' in the Streets: Anarchists, IWWs, Surrealists, Situationists and Provos in the 1960s as Recorded in the Pages of Rebel Worker and Heatwave, Charles H Kerr. 2005. 
 Abigail Susik, Surrealist Sabotage and the War on Work, Manchester University Press, 2021, pp. 182-237

External links 
 Chicago Surrealist Group
 Review of 2002 Chicago Surrealist Group exhibition at Heartland Cafe "Surrealism Here and Now" at ArtScope.net
 "Links to International surrealism"
 "Another Stupid War" (statement)
 Letter in New York Review of Books

American surrealist artists
Organizations based in Chicago
Surrealist groups
Industrial Workers of the World in Illinois